The Columbus RedStixx were a minor league baseball team in Columbus, Georgia. They were a Class A team in the South Atlantic League, and a farm team of the Cleveland Indians.

The RedStixx played home games at Golden Park, except during 1996. The team's home games were moved to Ragsdale Field on the campus of Columbus State University, while Golden Park was renovated to accommodate events of the 1996 Olympics. The name "RedStixx" refers to the Red Sticks, a faction of Creek Indians of the area.

History
In 1991, the South Atlantic League expanded, adding two teams, including one in Columbus. The team carried the nickname of the parent club, the Cleveland Indians, during its inaugural year. They took the name "RedStixx" for the remainder of their existence.

In 2002, the team announced their intention to move to Eastlake, Ohio following that year's regular season. The team renamed themselves the Lake County Captains. Although the Redstixx left Columbus, the South Georgia Waves arrived in town the next year.

The ballparks
The RedStixx played at Golden Park (1991-1995, 1997-2002) and for one season (1996) at Ragsdale Field, of Columbus State University. Golden Park, opened in 1951, is still in use and is located at 100 4th Street Columbus, Georgia 31901.

Notable alumni

 David Bell (baseball) (1991)
 Russell Branyan (1995-1996)
 Einar Diaz (1993-1994)
 Ricky Gutierrez (2000, MGR)
 Maicer Izturis (1999-2000)
 Damian Jackson (1993)
 Steve Kline (1994)
 Ted Kubiak (2001, MGR)
 Albie Lopez (1992)
 Torey Lovullo (2002, MGR) 2017 NL Manager of the Year
 Victor Martinez (2000) 5 x MLB All-Star
 Jhonny Peralta (2000) 3 x MLB All-Star
 C.C. Sabathia (1999) 6 x MLB All-Star; 2007 AL Cy Young Award
 Luke Scott (2002)
 Marco Scutaro (1996) MLB All-Star
 Richie Sexson (1994) 2 x MLB All-Star
 Joel Skinner (1996, MGR)
 Eric Wedge (1998, MGR) 2007 AL Manager of the Year
 Enrique Wilson (1994)
 Jaret Wright (1995)

Season-by-season records

|-
| 1991 || 73 || 69 || 5th || Did Not Qualify
|-
| 1992 || 77 || 62 || 2nd 1 || Lost in 1st round to Myrtle Beach Hurricanes 2-0.
|-
| 1993 || 86 || 56 || 2nd || Did Not Qualify
|-
| 1994 || 87 || 51 || 1st 1 || Lost in 1st round to Savannah Cardinals 2-0.
|-
| 1995 || 80 || 62 || 3rd 2 || Lost in 1st round to Augusta GreenJackets 2-0.
|-
| 1996 || 79 || 63 || 4th 2 || 1st round: beat Augusta GreenJackets 2-1. 2nd round: Lost to Savannah Sand Gnats 2-0.
|-
| 1997 || 62 || 76 || 12th || Did Not Qualify
|-
| 1998 || 59 || 81 || 7th || Did Not Qualify
|-
| 1999 || 70 || 71 || 7th 1 || Lost in 1st round.
|-
| 2000 || 67 || 70 || 7th 1 || 1st round: beat Augusta GreenJackets. Finals: Lost to Delmarva Shorebirds 3-0.
|-
| 2001 || 77 || 59 || 3rd || Did Not Qualify
|-
| 2002 || 79 || 60 || 3rd 2 || 1st round: beat Capital City Bombers. Finals: Lost to Hickory Crawdads 3-2.
|-

1- 1st half division champion
2- 2nd half division champion
1991: Columbus Indians 
1992-2002: Columbus RedStixx

External links
Baseball Reference

Cleveland Guardians minor league affiliates
Defunct South Atlantic League teams
Sports in Columbus, Georgia
1991 establishments in Georgia (U.S. state)
2002 disestablishments in Georgia (U.S. state)
Professional baseball teams in Georgia (U.S. state)
Baseball teams established in 1991
Baseball teams disestablished in 2002
Baseball teams in Georgia (U.S. state)
Defunct baseball teams in Georgia